Estevan Perera, Esq. (born April 21, 1982) is a Belizean attorney who was born and raised in Belize.

He has served in the capacity of Director for several notable Private and Government Boards across the country of Belize. These appointments have garnered him great respect as an expert in the fields of both real estate and corporate law. As the managing partner at the law firm of Estevan Perera & Company LLP, he specializes in private acquisitions, corporate law, intellectual property, and civil litigation.

Education 
Estevan Perera holds a Certificate of Legal Education from the Hugh Wooding Law School in Trinidad & Tobago (2007-2009). He also holds a Bachelor of Law (LLB) Degree from the University of the West Indies in Mona, Jamaica (2004-2007) and a Bachelor’s Degree in Criminology from St. Mary's University in Halifax, Nova Scotia, Canada (2001-2004).

Career 
Perera is currently the Managing Partner of the law firm of Estevan Perera & Company LLP located in the Alpha Business Centre at No. 2118 Guava Street, Belize City, Belize. Perera was called to the bar of Belize in 2009.

In 2017, Perera captured a notable victory in the Supreme Court in the case of Janine Vega vs. Laura Blanco & Others (Claim No. 171 of 2017), which ultimately paved the way for the amendment to the Money Lenders Act of Belize in the following year. The said judgment ultimately protects persons against usury interest rates and prevents pawnshops from illegally taking their customer’s property in exchange for debts owed.

Professional Experience 

 Trademark & Patent Agent
 Managing Partner, Estevan Perera & Company LLP
 Partner, Glenn D. Godfrey & Co. LLP, Attorneys at Law
 Legal Assistant at the law firm of Fred Lumor & Co.
 Legal Intern at Belize Legal Advice and Services Center
 Former Director of the National Institute of Culture and Heritage
 Former Director of Social Security Board of Belize
 Former Director of Belize Water Services Limited
 Former Member of the Belize Liquor License Board

Notable Appointments 

 Honorary Consul of the Republic of Estonia in Belize
 Former Chairman of the Elections and Boundaries Commission of Belize
 Appointed Temporary Senator in Belize on May 11, 2012

Boards & Committees 

 Member, Association of Real Estate Brokers of Belize (AREBB)
 Member, Belize Chamber of Commerce
 Member, Belize Offshore Practitioner's Association

Artistic & Creative Contribution to Belize 
THE BELIZE SIGN

Perera is the designer and creator of the first Belize Sign Monument which was constructed in September 2014 with a vision of encouraging patriotism among Belizeans. The sign was soon after inaugurated by the Belize City Council in 2015. The vibrant colors of the sign portray the diverse cultures that co-exist within Belize.

A second Belize Sign Monument was later constructed and installed in Belize City. The Belize Sign Monuments are now listed on Trip Advisor as one of the top 10 tourist attractions worth visiting in Belize City.

Philanthropy 
Giving back to the community has always been at the core of Perera’s life journey. He currently serves as an active member of the Rotary Club of Belize Sunrise and as a Director for the Inspiration Center of Belize. Both organizations work closely with those who are less fortunate seeking out ways to enrich the lives of those who need it most.

As a member of the Rotary Club of Belize Sunrise, Perera works tirelessly with other Rotarians to address concerns such as clean water, illiteracy, poverty, hunger, and health care while The Inspiration Center offers therapy and health services to children with disabilities and their families.

Personal life 
Perera is married to Shelley Perera (nee Estephan) and they share two children, Serafina and Alejandro.

References

1982 births
Living people
Members of the Senate (Belize)
Belizean lawyers